The Klein Vision AirCar is a two-seat flying car designed by Štefan Klein and made in Slovakia. It was type certified as an aircraft in January 2022.

Design and development
Slovak designer Professor Štefan Klein began working on flying cars in the late 1980s. Having developed the AeroMobil, he left the company to develop a new idea as the AirCar, and set up Klein Vision with colleague Anton Zajac.

The main fuselage of the AirCar doubles as a two-seat road car with four large road wheels. Styled like a sports coupe, it contributes 30-40 per cent of the total lift when in the air. For flight it is fitted with foldout wings and extending tailbooms carrying a high tail. A pusher propeller is permanently installed between the fuselage and tail, and a safety parachute is installed. Construction is primarily a semi-monocoque of carbon fibre composite over a steel subframe. Over 20 programmable servo motors are used to perform the transition between road and air configurations. When on the road, the retracted tail surface creates a downforce similar to conventional rear aerofoils.

Power is provided by a 1.6 litre BMW road car engine, running on automotive petrol or gasoline and delivering .

A second, pre-production prototype is expected to have a monocoque fuselage with a more powerful  engine.

The design was type certified as an aircraft in January 2022 in Slovakia. It also needs approval as a road vehicle before it can be used as such.

Performance
It is said to take two minutes and 15 seconds to transform from car into aircraft.

Operational history
The prototype first flew on 22 or 27 October 2020.

In June 2021 the prototype AirCar carried out a 35-minute flight between Nitra and Bratislava airports.

See also

References

 Jack Guy; "Klein Vision AirCar completes 35-minute test flight in Slovakia", CBS, 30 June 2021.

External links
 Klein Vision company web site.

Roadable aircraft